Bernard of Compostella is the name of two medieval Spanish ecclesiastical lawyers:

 Bernardus Compostellanus Antiquus (early thirteenth century)
 Bernardus Compostellanus Junior (mid-thirteenth century)